Loon River Airport  is located near Loon River, Alberta, Canada.

References

Registered aerodromes in Alberta
Northern Sunrise County